Puduchatram is a town panchayat located in the Namakkal district of Tamil Nadu state, India. The latitude 11.384679 and longitude 78.162495 are the geocoordinates of Puduchatram. It is the headquarter of Puduchatram block.

History 
Government higher secondary School is a past years in Annachatram. Annachatram process is passengers eat and staying. After some years that name has changed into Puduchatram. This village located on Salem to Namakkal NH7. Nowadays, this village is one of the very fast growing area in Namakkal District. Having lot of facilities like 24 Hrs Bus facility, Kavery river water facility, Hospital, Bank, School, College, Market, Shops and all basic needs available in this area. Railway Station held at Kannurpatty for Puduchatram.

Population 
10000 people in 6000 Households.

Agriculture 
Agriculture is a main source of revenue for nearby villages. The milk industry is also a major business in this area.

Government sectors 
Government Hospital, Puduchatram
Veterinary Hospital, Puduchatram
Union office, Puduchatram
Police station, Puduchatram
Traffic Police Station, Puduchatram
Sub Register office, Puduchatram
Village Administrative office, Puduchatram
Revinew Inspector Office
Agriculture office
Post Office
Electricity Board Office
Telephone Exchange Office 
Cooperative milk society
Cooperative handloom weavers society
Government Hospital

Schools and colleges 
Schools
Government Elementary School, Puduchatram.
Government Higher Secondary School, Puduchatram.
Rainbow Matriculation School, Puduchatram.
Vivekananda Vidyalaya Matriculation School, Puduchatram.
RGR Matric hr. sec school & International CBSE School, Puduchatram.
PAAVAI Vidyashram CBSE School, Puduchatram.
Gnanodhaya CBSE and Matriculation School,Puduchatram.
Colleges
Paavai Engineering College
Paavai College of Engineering
Paavai Polytechnic College
Paavai Teacher Training Institute
Rainbow Teacher Training Institute
Paavai Arts & Science College for Women
Paavai College of Management Studies
Ganamani College Of Technology
Gnanamani Engineering College
Government Arts And Science College, AndagalurGate

Nearby cities and towns 
Cities
Salem, Trichy, Coimbatore, Erode and Tiruppur.

Towns
Namakkal, Rasipuram, Tiruchengode, Paramathi velur

Nearby tourist places 
Kolli Hills
Kolli Hills was ruled by a king called valvil ori, one of the seven kings of the sangam age. A statue for him is located at semmedu at a distance of 58 kilometers from Puduchatram.

Yercaud
Yercaud at a distance of 62.7 kilometers from Puduchatram.

Namakkal district